Rajan Rai is a Nepalese politician belonging to CPN (Unified Socialist). He is also serving as member of Provincial Assembly.

He is currently serving as Minister for Social Development of Province No. 1.

Electoral history

2017 Nepalese provincial elections

See also 

 CPN (Unified Socialist)

References 

Communist Party of Nepal (Unified Socialist) politicians

Year of birth missing (living people)
Living people